The first series of Ex on the Beach Poland, a Polish television programme, began airing on 7 November 2016 on MTV. The show was announced in 17 October 2016. Cast member for this series include Warsaw Shore star Wojtek Gola. The series was filmed in Croatia.

Cast 
The official list of cast members was released on 24 October 2016 and includes four single boys: Adam Zając, Dawid Ambro, Michał Spała and Warsaw Shore cast member Wojtek Gola; as well as four single girls; Joanna Kościak, Jola Mróz, Marta Różańska and Sandra Sarapata.

Bold indicates original cast member; all other cast were brought into the series as an ex.

Duration of cast

Notes 
 Key:  = "Cast member" is featured in this episode.
 Key:  = "Cast member" arrives on the beach.
 Key:  = "Cast member" has an ex arrive on the beach.
 Key:  = "Cast member" arrives on the beach and has an ex arrive during the same episode.
 Key:  = "Cast member" leaves the beach.
 Key:  = "Cast member" does not feature in this episode.

Episodes

References 

2016 Polish television seasons
Poland (series 1)